Edmund Clauscen (17 June 1906 – 19 February 1983) was an  Australian rules footballer who played with North Melbourne in the Victorian Football League (VFL).

Originally from St Kilda Seconds, Clauscen came to Williamstown in 1926 and played a total of 41 games and kicked 8 goals for 'Town up until the end of the 1928 season. He then crossed to North Melbourne in 1929.

Notes

External links 

1906 births
1983 deaths
Australian rules footballers from Victoria (Australia)
North Melbourne Football Club players